Mount Summit is a town in Prairie Township, Henry County, Indiana, United States. The population was 352 at the 2010 census.

History
Mount Summit was platted in 1854. It was named for its lofty elevation. A post office has been in operation in Mount Summit since 1869.

Geography
Mount Summit is located at  (40.003921, -85.385497).

Highways
  
   State Road 3

Demographics

2010 census
As of the census of 2010, there were 352 people, 139 households, and 96 families living in the town. The racial makeup of the town was 97.2% White, 0.3% Native American, 0.6% from other races, and 2.0% from two or more races. Hispanic or Latino of any race were 2.3% of the population.

There were 139 households, of which 36.0% had children under the age of 18 living with them, 51.1% were married couples living together, 12.9% had a female householder with no husband present, 5.0% had a male householder with no wife present, and 30.9% were non-families. 27.3% of all households were made up of individuals, and 8.6% had someone living alone who was 65 years of age or older. The average household size was 2.53 and the average family size was 3.04.

The median age in the town was 42.1 years. 25% of residents were under the age of 18; 7.2% were between the ages of 18 and 24; 21.9% were from 25 to 44; 32.5% were from 45 to 64; and 13.6% were 65 years of age or older. The gender makeup of the town was 50.6% male and 49.4% female.

2000 census
As of the census of 2000, there were 313 people, 128 households, and 89 families living in the town. The racial makeup of the town was 98.40% White, 0.96% African American, and 0.64% from two or more races. Hispanic or Latino of any race were 3.51% of the population.

There were 128 households, out of which 28.1% had children under the age of 18 living with them, 60.2% were married couples living together, 5.5% had a female householder with no husband present, and 29.7% were non-families. 25.8% of all households were made up of individuals, and 12.5% had someone living alone who was 65 years of age or older. The average household size was 2.45 and the average family size was 2.92.

In the town, the population was spread out, with 24.9% under the age of 18, 6.7% from 18 to 24, 29.4% from 25 to 44, 23.6% from 45 to 64, and 15.3% who were 65 years of age or older. The median age was 38 years. For every 100 females, there were 95.6 males. For every 100 females age 18 and over, there were 91.1 males.

The median income for a household in the town was $48,000, and the median income for a family was $53,375. Males had a median income of $33,281 versus $22,321 for females. The per capita income for the town was $20,895. About 5.4% of families and 5.3% of the population were below the poverty line, including 2.7% of those under age 18 and none of those age 65 or over.

References

External links
 Town of Mount Summit, Indiana website

Towns in Henry County, Indiana
Towns in Indiana